Ernoporus is a genus of beetles belonging to the family Curculionidae.

Synonyms:

 Cryphalops Reitter, 1889 
 Stephanorhopalus Hopkins, 1915 
 Euptilius Schedl, 1940

Species:
 Ernoporus tiliae

References

Curculionidae
Curculionidae genera